The Arthoniaceae are a family of lichenized, lichenicolous and saprobic fungi in the order Arthoniales. The Arthoniaceae is the largest family of Arthoniales, with around 800 species. Most species in Arthoniaceae belong in Arthonia which is the largest genus with 500 species. The second and third largest genus is Arthothelium with 80 species, and Cryptothecia with 60 species.

Arthonia is the type genus of Arthoniaceae, and it is known to be a polyphyletic and paraphyletic genus. The process of splitting Arthonia into monophyletic groups is an ongoing process. In order to make Arthonia monophyletic, several genera have been described or resurrected.

Distribution
The species in Arthoniaceae have a worldwide distribution, but are especially prevalent in tropical areas with a Mediterranean climate. They are known from arctic to tropical latitudes, as well as variating altitudes from sea level to alpine regions, distributed in both humid forests and dry habitats.

Ecology
Collectively, the family have a highly variable ecology with lichenized, lichenicolous and saprobic fungi.  The majority of species are lichenized with a photobiont from Trentepohliaceae and a few species in Arthonia are lichenized with a photobiont from Chlorococcaleae. They grow on leaves, bark, bryophytes, and rocks. Other species are lichenicolous (growing on other lichens), and a few species are known to be saprobic.

History
The family was circumscribed by Heinrich Gottlieb Ludwig Reichenbach in 1841.

Genera

, Species Fungorum accepts 25 genera and 392 species in the family Arthoniaceae. This is a list of the genera in the Arthoniaceae  based on a 2020 review and summary of fungal classification by Wijayawardene and colleagues. Following the genus name is the taxonomic authority (those who first circumscribed the genus; standardized author abbreviations are used), year of publication, and the number of species:

Amazonomyces  – 2 spp.
Arthonia  – ca. 50 + ca. 300 orphaned spp.
Arthothelium  – 10 + ca. 100 orphaned spp.
Briancoppinsia  – 1 sp.
Coniangium  – 4 spp.
Coniarthonia  – 12 spp.
Coniocarpon  – 6 spp.
Crypthonia  – 16 spp.
Cryptophaea  – 1 spp.
Cryptothecia  – ca. 65
Eremothecella  – 8 spp.
Glomerulophoron  – 2 spp.
Helicobolomyces  – 2 spp.
Herpothallon  – ca. 50
Inoderma  – 4 spp.
Leprantha  – 1 sp.
Myriostigma  – 7 spp.
Pachnolepia  –1 sp.
Reichlingia  – 4 spp.
Snippocia  – 1 sp.
Sporodophoron  – 4 spp.
Staurospora  – 1 sp.
Stirtonia  – ca. 25 spp.
Tylophoron  – 11 spp.

References

 
Lichen families
Ascomycota families
Taxa named by Ludwig Reichenbach
Taxa described in 1841